The 2019 season was Melaka United Soccer Association's 96th season in club history and 3rd season in the Malaysia Super League.

Kits
 Supplier: Warrix Sports
 Main sponsors: Edra & CGN
 Other sponsors: Restoran Melayu, Hatten Groups

Management team

Players

Transfers

In
1st leg

2nd leg

Out
1st leg

2nd leg

Friendlies

Tour of Vietnam (12 to 15 Jan 2019)

Competitions

Overview

Malaysia Super League

Table

Results summary

Fixtures and results

Malaysia FA Cup

Malaysia Cup

Group stage

Statistics

Appearances and goals
Correct as of match played on 4 August 2019

|-
! colspan="16" style="background:#dcdcdc; text-align:center"|Players transferred out or on loan during the season

|}

References 

Melaka United F.C.
Melaka United F.C. seasons
Malaysian football clubs 2019 season
Malaysian football club seasons by club